The 2018 English Open (known for sponsorship reasons as the 2018 BetVictor English Open) was a professional ranking snooker tournament, that took place from 15 to 21 October 2018 in Crawley, West Sussex, England. It was the sixth ranking event of the 2018/2019 season and a part of the Home Nations Series.

The defending champion was Ronnie O'Sullivan, who defeated Kyren Wilson in the 2017 event. However, O'Sullivan would lose to Mark Davis 1–6 in the semi-final. O'Sullivan was highly critical of the venue stating "The worst part was not the smell of urine..."This is about as bad as I've ever seen. It's a bit of a hellhole....I don't know what this gaff is, but I've just done an interview and all I can smell is urine."

Stuart Bingham won his fifth professional ranking title with a 9–7 victory against Mark Davis, who had reached his first ever ranking final at the age of 46, playing in his 28th season on the professional tour. Bingham became the first player to win two Home Nations Series events.

Thepchaiya Un-Nooh made the second maximum break of his career in the opening frame of his 4–1 first round win against Soheil Vahedi. On the following day Ronnie O'Sullivan made the 15th maximum break of his career in the final frame of the second round whitewash of Allan Taylor. This was the fourth time that two maximums were made at the main stage of a ranking tournament, and the third time in just over half a year.

Prize fund
The breakdown of prize money for this year is shown below:

 Winner: £70,000
 Runner-up: £30,000
 Semi-final: £20,000
 Quarter-final: £10,000
 Last 16: £6,000
 Last 32: £3,500
 Last 64: £2,500

 Highest break: £2,000
 Total: £366,000

The "rolling 147 prize" for a maximum break: £15,000

Tournament draw

Top half

Section 1

Section 2

Section 3

Section 4

Bottom half

Section 5

Section 6

Section 7

Section 8

Finals

Final

Century breaks
Total: 81

 147, 135, 118, 104  Ronnie O'Sullivan
 147, 112  Thepchaiya Un-Nooh
 141, 136, 132, 121, 105  Ryan Day
 140  Zhou Yuelong
 138, 131, 109, 102  Stuart Bingham
 137  Marco Fu
 136, 136, 107, 104, 102  Mark Davis
 136, 128, 100  Luo Honghao
 136, 116, 100  Tian Pengfei
 135  Elliot Slessor
 133  Sunny Akani
 131, 101  Ben Woollaston
 129, 101  Sam Craigie
 129  Mike Dunn
 126, 109, 108, 107, 104  Judd Trump
 122  Jak Jones
 121, 106, 106  Barry Hawkins
 121  Ashley Carty
 121  Allan Taylor
 120, 100  Sam Baird
 116, 109  Mark Williams
 116, 103  Ali Carter
 116  Robert Milkins
 115  Thor Chuan Leong
 114, 102, 100, 100  Noppon Saengkham
 113  Liam Highfield
 113  Zhang Anda
 112, 102, 100  Neil Robertson
 112  Liang Wenbo
 109, 109  Martin Gould
 109  Luca Brecel
 108, 101  David Gilbert
 108  Paul Davison
 107  Anthony McGill
 106, 100  Mark Selby
 105  Ricky Walden
 105  John Higgins
 104  Stuart Carrington
 102  Yan Bingtao
 102  Stephen Maguire
 102  Mei Xiwen
 101  Matthew Selt
 100  Jack Lisowski

References

Home Nations Series
2018
English Open
English Open (snooker)
Sport in Crawley
October 2018 sports events in the United Kingdom
2010s in West Sussex